Taxco is an impact crater on Mars.  It was named by the IAU in 1976 after the town of Taxco in Mexico.

Taxco is located in Chryse Planitia, east of Punsk crater and south of Tarsus crater.

References 

Impact craters on Mars